Chad Karl Reineke (born April 9, 1982) is an American former professional baseball pitcher. He played in Major League Baseball (MLB) for the San Diego Padres, Oakland Athletics, and Cincinnati Reds.

Personal life
Reineke attended Ayersville High School. He married long-time girlfriend Kelli Battershell on November 7, 2009.

College career
Reineke attended Miami University in which he played college ball. For the RedHawks, he was mainly used as a relief pitcher, but would make the occasional start.

Major League Baseball
Reineke was drafted by the Houston Astros in the 13th round (394th overall) of the 2004 Major League Baseball Draft.

Houston Astros
After signing with the Astros on June 16, 2004, Reineke was assigned to the Single-A Tri-City ValleyCats. For the ValleyCats, he pitched in 23 games, all in relief, and had a 1-2 record with a 2.45 ERA and 3 saves. He was both a starter and a reliever for the Legends, making 11 starts and 31 relief appearances. Reineke went a combined 10-8 with a 3.52 ERA and got 4 saves.

In , Reineke played at two levels, the Single-A Salem Avalanche and the Double-A Corpus Christi Hooks. For the Avalanche, he was in their starting rotation, making 17 starts and posting a 6-5 record with a 2.98 ERA. For the Hooks, he was primarily used as a reliever, playing in a total of 15 games and getting a 1-3 record with a 3.05 ERA.

Making 16 starts and the same number of relief appearances, Reineke went a combined 5-5 with a 4.68 ERA.

On November 20, 2007, Reineke's contract was purchased, protecting him from the Rule 5 draft.

San Diego Padres
On July 22, 2008, he was traded to the San Diego Padres for Randy Wolf. On August 16, Reineke made his Major League debut as the starting pitcher for the Padres against the Philadelphia Phillies. He pitched five innings, giving up three runs, getting the win, and also going 1 for 2 at the plate with an RBI single. He earned his second win by defeating Brandon Webb, who was seeking his 20th win of the season.

Oakland Athletics
Before the 2009 minor league baseball season began, Reineke was traded to the Oakland Athletics for outfielder J. D. Pruitt. Reineke has played for the A's Triple-A farm team, the Sacramento River Cats. He was called up to make an emergency start for the A's on August 5, 2009, and returned to Sacramento the next day. In November 2009, Reineke was granted free agency.

Cincinnati Reds
On December 22, 2009, Reineke signed a minor league contract with the Cincinnati Reds. He spent the entire 2010 season with their Triple-A farm team, the Louisville Bats. He received a non-roster invitation to spring training for 2011.

He had his contract purchased by the Reds on May 31, 2011. He started that night against Milwaukee in place of the injured Homer Bailey. He was designated for assignment after one start for the Reds, presumably to clear a roster space for another player. On October 10, he elected free agency. He re-signed a minor league contract with the Reds on November 28. He was released by the Louisville Bats on June 1, 2014.

References

External links

1982 births
Living people
Baseball players from Ohio
Cincinnati Reds players
Corpus Christi Hooks players
Estrellas Orientales players
American expatriate baseball players in the Dominican Republic
Leones del Caracas players
American expatriate baseball players in Venezuela
Lexington Legends players
Louisville Bats players
Major League Baseball pitchers
Mesa Solar Sox players
Miami RedHawks baseball players
Oakland Athletics players
People from Defiance, Ohio
Portland Beavers players
Round Rock Express players
Sacramento River Cats players
Salem Avalanche players
San Diego Padres players
Tri-City ValleyCats players